Evenson is a surname. Notable people with the surname include:

Alexander Evenson (1892–1919), Russian chess master
Brian Evenson (born 1966), American academic and writer of both literary fiction and popular fiction
Dean Evenson, New Age musician and producer
Jim Evenson, running back who played seven seasons in the Canadian Football League
Tom Evenson (1910–1997), English athlete who competed for Great Britain in the 1932 and 1936 Summer Olympics